Alexander (Gr. ) was the name of a number of different artists in ancient Greece and Rome:
Alexander, a painter, one of whose productions was said by Johann Joachim Winckelmann to be extant, painted on a marble tablet which bears his name.
Alexander, a son of king Perseus of Macedon, who was a skillful metalsmith.
Marcus Lollius Alexander, an engraver of gems, whose name occurs in an inscription in Doni.

References

Ancient Greek painters
Ancient Greek artists
Ancient Roman artists